The 1996–97 Macedonian Football Cup was the 5th season of Macedonia's football knockout competition. FK Sloga Jugomagnat were the defending champions, having won their first title. The 1996–97 champions were FK Sileks who won their second title.

Competition calendar

Source:

First round

|colspan="3" style="background-color:#97DEFF" align=center|11 August 1996

      

|}

Group stage
The winners of the groups were advanced to the semifinals.

Group 1

Group 2

Group 3

Group 4

Source:

Semi-finals 

|}

Source:

Final

See also
1996–97 Macedonian First Football League
1996–97 Macedonian Second Football League

References

External links
 1996–97 Macedonian Football Cup at rsssf.org

Macedonia
Cup
Macedonian Football Cup seasons